Hathor 2 - Coptic Calendar - Hathor 4

The third day of the Coptic month of Hathor, the third month of the Coptic year. On a common year, this day corresponds to October 30, of the Julian Calendar, and November 12, of the Gregorian Calendar. This day falls in the Coptic season of Peret, the season of emergence.

Commemorations

Saints 

 The martyrdom of Saint Athanasius and his sister Saint Irene 
 The martyrdom of Saint Aghathon 
 The departure of Saint Cyriacus of Corinth

References 

Days of the Coptic calendar